St. Ansgar is a city in Mitchell County, Iowa, United States. The population was 1,160 at the 2020 census.

History
St. Ansgar is named for the patron saint of Scandinavia, a French Benedictine monk who Christianized much of Denmark, Sweden, and northern Germany between 830 and 865 A.D. The town is the site of First Lutheran Church of St. Ansgar, a pioneer Norwegian Lutheran Church founded in December 1853 by Rev. Claus Lauritz Clausen, who was commissioned by the Lutheran Church of Norway to form congregations for Norwegian immigrants in Wisconsin, Iowa, and Minnesota.

The St. Ansgar church, congregation and town served as a center for the dispersion of Norwegian immigrant settlers north across the border into Minnesota and on into western Iowa from the mid-1850s into the late 1870s. Rev. Clausen formed 21 additional congregations. First Lutheran Church of St. Ansgar, a graceful building constructed of limestone quarried from the banks of the nearby Cedar River and native hardwoods, is the oldest continuously active Lutheran congregation west of the Mississippi River (Booklet published by the First Lutheran Church of St. Ansgar on the occasion of the 150th anniversary of the congregation, 1853–2003; available in the Iowa State Historical Society collection, Iowa City, Iowa, and at the church.)

Pastors in the Church of Norway received university training in census record keeping; the current parish keeps copies of congregation records continuously from founding to the present, making these records a significant genealogical resource.

A fortified stone outbuilding locally called Fort Severson, 5.5 miles northwest of St. Ansgar near Carpenter, Iowa, was built in 1867 by settlers associated with the Clausen settlement anxious about the continued presence of Dakota Indians traveling through the area along the Deer Creek and the Cedar River. The settlers fears were animated by the killing of settlers during the Spirit Lake Massacre in 1857 and the Dakota Uprising of 1862. The distinctively fortified building, which functioned both as a barn and a fort, is the sole surviving example of many that were built.

Geography
St. Ansgar is located at  (43.378814, -92.919576).

Demographics

2010 census
As of the census of 2010, there were 1,107 people, 468 households, and 303 families living in the city. The racial makeup of the city was 99.2% White, 0.3% Asian, and 0.5% from two or more races. Hispanic or Latino of any race were 0.8% of the population.

There were 468 households, of which 26.3% had children under the age of 18 living with them, 54.5% were married couples living together, 7.5% had a female householder with no husband present, 2.8% had a male householder with no wife present, and 35.3% were non-families. 31.4% of all households were made up of individuals, and 18.2% had someone living alone who was 65 years of age or older. The average household size was 2.26 and the average family size was 2.84.

The median age in the city was 45.2 years. 23.9% of residents were under the age of 18; 6% were between the ages of 18 and 24; 19.9% were from 25 to 44; 24% were from 45 to 64; and 26% were 65 years of age or older. The gender makeup of the city was 46.7% male and 53.3% female.

2000 census
As of the census of 2000, there were 1,031 people, 447 households, and 282 families living in the city. The racial makeup of the city was 99.61% White, 0.19% Asian, and 0.19% from two or more races. Hispanic or Latino of any race were 0.19% of the population.

There were 447 households, out of which 21.7% had children under the age of 18 living with them, 55.0% were married couples living together, 6.0% had a female householder with no husband present, and 36.7% were non-families. 34.0% of all households were made up of individuals, and 22.1% had someone living alone who was 65 years of age or older. The average household size was 2.13 and the average family size was 2.70.

In the city, the population was spread out, with 17.9% under the age of 18, 6.0% from 18 to 24, 19.8% from 25 to 44, 24.9% from 45 to 64, and 31.3% who were 65 years of age or older. The median age was 50 years. For every 100 females, there were 77.8 males. For every 100 females age 18 and over, there were 74.4 males.

The median income for a household in the city was $33,977, and the median income for a family was $46,667. Males had a median income of $28,704 versus $20,294 for females. The per capita income for the city was $16,100. About 6.6% of families and 9.3% of the population were below the poverty line, including 15.6% of those under age 18 and 3.9% of those age 65 or over.

Education
It is within the St. Ansgar Community School District school district.

Notable people

Ryan Hannam (born 1980) NFL player
Claus Lauritz Clausen, founder of Saint Ansgar with Christopher Hansen (Rustad); they surveyed the site in fall of 1853, and brought the first wagon train of Norwegian settlers in spring 1854 from Rock Valley Norwegian settlement in Wisconsin (near present-day Beloit); Clausen was a Norwegian Lutheran minister who founded 1st Lutheran.

References

External links
 City website

Cities in Mitchell County, Iowa
Cities in Iowa